El Camino is the third studio album by American R&B/soul artist Adriana Evans, released in April 2007 under Expansion Records. The album was written and produced by Evans herself, along with music producer husband Jonathan "Dred" Scott.  
The release features 12 new tracks including the UK singles, "Hey Now", "Before You" and "All for Love", and the stand out ballads "Blue Bird" and "Same As I Ever Was". The album was reissued in Japan and includes extra bonus tracks.

Track listing
All tracks written by Adriana Evans and Jonathan "Dred" Scott, unless noted.

Personnel
Adrian Evans: All Vocals
Jonathan Scott: Producer
Adriana Evans: Co-producer
Luke Miller: Keyboards (Tracks 1, 4, 5, 6, 7, 9, 10)
Samir Elmehdaoui: Bass Guitar (Tracks 1, 2, 3, 4, 5, 6, 7, 8, 9, 10, 12)
Bjon Watson: Trumpet (Tracks 2, 6, 10)
Louis Van Taylor: Flute, Saxophone (Tracks, Flute & Sax: 1, Flute: 3, Flute & Sax: 6)
David Williams: Mastered 
Preston Boebel: Recorded, Mixed

Credits
Producer – Jonathan Dred Scott
Co-producer – Adriana Evans
Remix Producers - Gota Yashiki: "Hey Now (Gota Remix)", Johnathan Dred Scott: "Hey Now (Electric Remix)", "All for Love (Backpack Remix")

Notes
Japanese Edition includes 3 bonus tracks

References

External links
adrianaevans.com
www.oldies.com
Adriana Evans-El Camino (Japan Issue)

2007 albums
Adriana Evans albums
Albums produced by Dred Scott (musician)
Expansion Records albums